{{Speciesbox
|image =
|status =
|status_system =
|genus = Rubus
|species = aboriginum
|authority = Rydb. 1913
|synonyms = 
 Rubus almus L.H.Bailey
 Rubus austrinus L.H.Bailey
 Rubus bollianus L.H.Bailey
 Rubus clair-brownii L.H.Bailey
 Rubus decor L.H. Bailey
 Rubus flagellaris var. almus L.H.Bailey
 Rubus foliaceus L.H. Bailey
 Rubus ignarus L.H. Bailey
 Rubus ricei L.H. Bailey 
|synonyms_ref = 
}}Rubus aboriginum is a North American species of dewberry, known as the garden dewberry and  aboriginal dewberry'''. Like other dewberries, it is a species of flowering plant in the rose family, related to the blackberry. It is native to the United States and Mexico, primarily in the southern Great Plains.

Branches appear 'hairy' when young, and become smooth as they mature, with infrequent, short, hooked thorns. The fruits resemble other dewberries or small blackberries.R. aboriginum is very closely related to the northern dewberry, Rubus flagellaris'', and is sometimes treated as a subspecies.

Distribution and habitat 
It is native to the United States and Mexico, primarily in the southern Great Plains with additional populations scattered in the eastern US and in Nuevo León.

The species typically inhabits areas of rocky soil and partial shade, such as open woodlands and abandoned fields.

References

External links

aboriginum
Berries
Plants described in 1913
Flora of North America